The 2008 Tashkent Challenger was a professional tennis tournament played on indoor hard courts. It was the second edition of the tournament which was part of the 2008 ATP Challenger Series. It took place in Tashkent, Uzbekistan between 13 and 19 October 2008.

Singles main-draw entrants

Seeds

 Rankings are as of October 6, 2008.

Other entrants
The following players received wildcards into the singles main draw:
  Farrukh Dustov
  Dudi Sela
  Murad Inoyatov
  Vaja Uzakov

The following players received entry from the qualifying draw:
  Rohan Bopanna
  Oliver Marach
  Noam Okun
  Nathan Thompson

Champions

Singles

 Lu Yen-hsun def.  Mathieu Montcourt, 6–3, 6–2

Doubles

 Flavio Cipolla /  Pavel Šnobel def.  Mikhail Elgin /  Alexander Kudryavtsev, 6–3, 6–4

References

External links
Uzbekistan Tennis Federation website
ITF Search 

Tashkent Challenger
Tashkent Challenger